Fluky's is a Chicago-area fast food restaurant and mail-order food purveyor known for hot dogs.

History 
Fluky's began in Chicago in 1929 on Maxwell and Halsted Streets. Founded by Abe Drexler, the original stand is self acknowledged as the originator of the Chicago-style hot dog. They sold what was known as a "Depression Sandwich," a frankfurter on a bun with mustard, pickle relish, onion, dill pickle, hot peppers, and tomatoes, accompanied by french fries, for 5 cents.

Still owned by the Drexler family, Fluky's maintains an in-store restaurant in a Wal-Mart in Niles, Illinois. The one-time chain had dwindled by the time the last city of Chicago Fluky's, 6821 N. Western Ave., changed its name to U Lucky Dawg on February 14, 2006; that site had been owned by a licensee for the previous ten years. A later location in Buffalo Grove, Illinois, was open only a short time.

References

Hot dog restaurants in the United States
Regional restaurant chains in the United States
Restaurants in Chicago
Restaurants established in 1929
1929 establishments in Illinois